Assyrian Orthodox Church may refer to:

Assyrian community in the Georgian Orthodox Church, dated back to the 6th century
Assyrian community in the Russian Orthodox Church, organized in 1898
Syriac Orthodox Church, some Syriac Orthodox parishes in North America once referred to themselves as Assyrian Orthodox
Assyrian Church of the East, Assyrian church that follows the Gregorian Calendar
Ancient Church of the East, Assyrian church that follows the Julian Calendar

See also
Assyrian (disambiguation)
Assyrian Church (disambiguation)
Orthodox Church (disambiguation)